The 33rd South American Junior Championships in Athletics were held in Santa Fe, Argentina at the Centro de Alto Rendimiento Deportivo Pedro Candioti from October 11–13, 2001.  The combined events and walks were held in conjunction with the Pan American Junior Championships that took place at the same site from October 18–20, 2001.

Participation (unofficial)
Detailed result lists can be found on the "World Junior Athletics History" website.  An unofficial count yields the number of about 265 athletes from about 13 countries:  Argentina (61). Bolivia (8), Brazil (67), Chile (37), Colombia (19), Ecuador (11), Guyana (2), Panama (2), Paraguay (12), Peru (6), Suriname (2), Uruguay (10), Venezuela (28).

Medal summary
Medal winners are published for men and women
Complete results can be found on the "World Junior Athletics History" website.

Men

Women

Medal table (unofficial)

References

External links
World Junior Athletics History

South American U20 Championships in Athletics
2001 in Argentine sport
South American U20 Championships
International athletics competitions hosted by Argentina
2001 in South American sport
2001 in youth sport
October 2001 sports events in South America